Edwin Stewart Underhill (October 7, 1861 – February 7, 1929) was a U.S. Representative from New York.

Born in Bath, New York, Underhill attended the common schools of his native city and Haverling High School at Bath. He graduated from Yale College in 1881.

He died as the result of an automobile accident in Coopers Plains, New York, February 7, 1929. He was interred in Grove Cemetery, Bath, New York.

Political service
He served as presidential elector on the Democratic ticket in 1888.

Underhill was elected as a Democrat to the Sixty-second and Sixty-third Congresses (March 4, 1911 – March 3, 1915).
He served as chairman of the Committee on Industrial Arts and Expositions (Sixty-third Congress). He was not a candidate for renomination in 1914.

He served as delegate to the Democratic National Convention at Houston, Texas, in 1928.

Professional life
His father owned the Steuben Farmers' Advocate newspaper in Bath, and Edwin Underhill he served as editor there, and at the Canandaigua Messenger, before becoming editor and publisher of the Daily Democrat in Corning, New York, in 1899.

After his political service he returned to newspapers; he was publisher of the Democrat and its successor, The Evening Leader, until his death, and his descendants continued to run the newspaper until 1972.

He also engaged in banking, serving as vice president of the Farmers &
Mechanics' Trust Co., Bath, New York.

See also
List of United States representatives from New York
Politics of the United States

Sources

Peer, Dick. "The Leader: About Us". The Leader, Corning, New York. Retrieved May 23, 2012.

1861 births
1929 deaths
Yale College alumni
Democratic Party members of the United States House of Representatives from New York (state)
People from Steuben County, New York